The Church of the Holy Sepulchre (also known as Te Mīhana Māori) is an historic church near the CBD of Auckland, New Zealand. It has played an important role in the history and development of the Anglican denomination in Auckland, being first a central parish church, then the home of the Māori Anglican Mission (Te Mīhana Māori). Its separate hall was originally the temporary home for St Paul's Church and is now Tātai Hono marae. When the church was constructed, it had the tallest steeple in Auckland, and retains aesthetic qualities as well as being a major landmark. The church has ongoing strong spiritual, cultural and social values, and welcomes all people in a Tikanga Māori Anglican setting.

History

The original St Sepulchre’s was a chapel built in the Anglican section of the Symonds Street Cemetery opened by Bishop Selwyn 27 August 1865, with Reverend Benjamin Dudley in charge of the district. The parish was established in 1870 to serve the western part of Auckland, and included the city’s main prison and hospital. As the demands of the growing colonial city grew, a new ridge-top site in opulent Grafton was purchased for a larger purpose-built structure in 1879.

The foundation stone was laid in 1880 by the first Bishop of Auckland William Cowie the following year. The architect was Edward Mahoney of the firm of E. Mahoney and Son, an architecture practice which specialised in designing gothic revival buildings in wood.  Making the most of its prominent location to the south of the city centre, the timber building included the tallest steeple in the city, a well-appointed timbered interior, seating for 680, a bell, stained glass windows and elements from the first chapel. Bishop Cowie consecrated the new church on 29 June 1881, with Benjamin Dudley continuing in leadership. 

The timber hall was moved to the Holy Sepulchre site in 1898, to the south of the church. It had been built in 1885 as a temporary place of worship and school for Auckland’s first church, St Paul’s, after their original building had to be demolished. After some modifications for classrooms, a small lean-to kitchen and bathroom, the building was also opened by Bishop Cowie, and accommodated a Sunday School of 325 children. 

In the 1930s a Lady Chapel was added to the main building. 

The parish was formerly closed in October 1963, largely due that part of the city being re-zoned to ‘light industrial’ as well as population drift to the suburbs after World War II. The complex was taken over by the Auckland City Mission, and in 1969 the church was dedicated as Te Mīhana Māori o Tāmaki Makaurau, the Auckland Anglican Māori Mission, overseen by the Reverend Kingi Ihaka, reflecting the movement of Māori from rural to urban centers during the 1950s and 1960s. 

In 1990 the ownership of the church, hall and vicarage was transferred to Te Komiti Tumuaki, the Māori arm of the Diocese of Auckland.

In the early 2000s, during Canon Roger Hill’s term as Missioner and church manager, the main church building was fully restored for a cost of $480,000, including recladding the steeple in donated copper.

Holy Sepulchre was used as a location for Aotearoa New Zealand's first Māori language full-length feature film Te Tangata Whai Rawa o Weniti The Maori Merchant of Venice in 2001,  which includes themes of "religious discrimination and revenge for past wrongs".

On 4 July 2009 the church hall was refurbished and rededicated as a marae and named Tātai Hono, which means ‘bound together’. The refurbishments included new entrance whakairo by Bernard Makoare, community tukutuku panels and paintings by Theresa Reihana.

Gallery

References

Holy Sepulchre
Heritage New Zealand Category 1 historic places in the Auckland Region
Listed churches in New Zealand
Anglican churches in New Zealand
1880s architecture in New Zealand